Arthromeris is a genus of ferns in the family Polypodiaceae, subfamily Drynarioideae, according to the Pteridophyte Phylogeny Group classification of 2016 (PPG I).

References

External links 

 eflora.org

Polypodiaceae
Fern genera